California Jaguars were an American soccer team that played in Salinas, California at the Salinas Sports Complex.

They joined the USISL in 1995 as the Monterey Bay Jaguars, but changed the name a year later.  They played in the A-League in 1997 and 1998 seasons then moved to the USL D3 Pro League, later named the Pro Select League, in 1999.

Year-by-year

Coaches
 Greg Petersen: 1995
 Mark Semioli: 1995
 Orlando Cervantes: 1999
Joe Silveira 1996–1997
Gaspar Silveira 1996–1997
Carlos Volpini  1998

Front Office

External links
Logo

Defunct soccer clubs in California
USISL teams
Defunct United Soccer League teams
A-League (1995–2004) teams
Soccer clubs in California
1995 establishments in California
1999 disestablishments in California
Association football clubs established in 1995
Association football clubs disestablished in 1999
Sports in Salinas, California
Sports in Monterey County, California